Thomas Lee Jones (June 22, 1931 – August 28, 1978) was an American and Canadian football player who played for the Ottawa Rough Riders and Toronto Argonauts. He won the Grey Cup with Ottawa in 1960. He played college football at Kentucky State University and Miami University and was selected by the Cleveland Browns in the 1954 NFL draft (Round 9, #108 overall). He played 2 games for them in 1955.

References

1931 births
1978 deaths
American football defensive tackles
Canadian football defensive linemen
American players of Canadian football
Kentucky State Thorobreds football players
Miami RedHawks football players
Cleveland Browns players
Ottawa Rough Riders players
Toronto Argonauts players
Players of American football from Cincinnati
Players of Canadian football from Cincinnati